Rodrigo Guerrero (born 10 January 1988) is a Mexican professional boxer who held the IBF super flyweight title from 2011 to 2012.

Professional career
In July 2008, Guerrero defeated Juan Alberto Rosas to win the WBC Continental Americas bantamweight title.

On 8 October 2011 Guerrero upset Raúl Martínez to win the IBF super flyweight title.

See also
List of Mexican boxing world champions
List of IBF world champions
List of super flyweight boxing champions

References

External links

|-

Boxers from Mexico City
International Boxing Federation champions
World super-flyweight boxing champions
Super-flyweight boxers
Southpaw boxers
1988 births
Living people
Mexican male boxers